Palaquium stipulare is a tree in the family Sapotaceae. The specific epithet stipulare refers to the stipules.

Description
The bark is brownish grey. Inflorescences bear up to four flowers.

Distribution and habitat
Palaquium stipulare is endemic to Borneo, where it is known only from Sarawak. Its habitat is lowland mixed dipterocarp forests.

References

stipulare
Endemic flora of Borneo
Trees of Borneo
Flora of Sarawak
Plants described in 1909